The Hyena of London is a 1964 Italian horror film directed by Luigi Mangini as Henry Wilson.

Plot
In 1883 London, a gaunt and somber serial killer named Martin Bauer, who as "The Hyena" had terrorized London for three years with a string of serial strangulations, is captured and condemned to hang. After the lunatic is executed, however, his body disappears from his grave and a new series of strangulation killings begins in the same area.

Dr. Edward is convinced that Bauer has returned from the grave. His daughter Muriel is in love with an irresponsible young man named Henry Quinn, who is attempting to see her against her father's wishes. Edward's alcoholic assistant, Dr. Anthony Finney, is secretly in love with Muriel and frames Quinn as a suspect in the recent spate of killings, leading to the young man's arrest. It is later revealed that the killer is Dr. Edward, who stole Martin Bauer's body from its resting place and surgically grafted a piece of the killer's brain into his own, transferring the killer's mad compulsions to himself. The mad doctor is shot dead by the police as he is attempting to strangle Henry Quinn in the woods.

Cast
Cast is source from the book Italian Gothic Horror Films, 1957-1968.

Production
Director Luigi Mangini  was predominantly a screenwriter, who has claimed to have written over 100 scripts, a number that film critic and historian Roberto Curti described as "a number that must be drastically toned down." Prior to directing The Hyena of London, he wrote films as early as the mid-fifties with Toto all'inferno. Many of his screenplays were written under the pen name Henry Wilson. He debuted as a director in 1963, co-directing a political documentary on Russia with Piero Ghione, shot in the Monti Parioli district of Rome, at Villa Perucchetti.

The film score by Francesco De Masi in The Hyena of London was taken from Riccardo Freda's film The Ghost and was later re-used in the film Beyond the Darkness.

Release
The Hyena of London was distributed theatrically in Italy by Geosfilms on 23 June 1964. The film grossed a total of 44,000,000 Italian lire in Italy. It was released theatrically in the United States in 1966 by Walter Manley Enterprises.
By the late 1980s, San Francisco's label Loonic Video released a home video version of the film promoting it as a British production.

Reception

In retrospective reviews, Tim Lucas referred to the film in 1989 as a "forgotten, but fascinating picture from the Italian Golden Age." Curti described the film as obscure in Italy, and found it to be "one of Italian gothic horror's most schizophrenic oddities", finding the film a bit cliche whodunnit, he found that director managed to develop a few atmospheric shots.

Footnotes

Sources

External links
 

Films shot in Rome
Films set in London
Italian horror films
1964 horror films
1964 films
Gothic horror films
Films scored by Francesco De Masi
Films set in 1883
1960s Italian films